Hallelujah (haləlū-Yāh, meaning "praise Yah") is an interjection from the Hebrew language, used as an expression of gratitude to God. The term is used 24 times in the Hebrew Bible (in the book of Psalms), twice in deuterocanonical books, and four times in the Christian Book of Revelation.

The phrase is used in Judaism as part of the Hallel prayers, and in Christian prayer, where since the earliest times it is used in various ways in liturgies, especially those of the Catholic Church, the Lutheran Churches and the Eastern Orthodox Church, the three of which use the Latin form alleluia which is based on the alternative Greek transliteration.

Etymology
The word hallēl in Hebrew means a joyous praise in song. The second part, Yah, is a shortened form of YHWH (Yahweh or Jehovah in modern English).

Interpretation
In the Hebrew Bible hallelujah is actually a two-word phrase, halelu-Yah, and not one word. The first part, halelu, is the second-person imperative masculine plural form of the Hebrew verb hillel. The phrase "hallelujah" translates to "praise Jah" or "praise Yah", though it carries a deeper meaning as the word halel in Hebrew means a joyous praise in song, to boast in God.

The second part, Yah, is a shortened form of YHWH, the name of the national god of Israel. The name ceased to be pronounced in Second Temple Judaism, by the 3rd century BC due to religious beliefs. The correct pronunciation is not known, however, it is sometimes rendered in non-Jewish sources as "Yahweh" or "Jehovah". The Septuagint translates Yah as Kyrios (the ), because of the Jewish custom of replacing the sacred name with "Adonai", meaning "my Lord".

In  the Hebrew reads kol han'shamah t'halel yah halelu-yah; the first "hallel" and "yah" in this verse are two separate words, and the word "yah" is translated as "the LORD", or "YHWH". In 148:1 the Hebrew says  halelu yah halelu eth-YHWH, notably including both the shortened Yah and the full name of YHWH. 

Most well-known English versions of the Hebrew Bible translate the Hebrew "Hallelujah" (as at ) as "Praise the ", though "" is instead translated as "Yah" in the Lexham English Bible and Young's Literal Translation, "Jah" in the New World Translation, "Jehovah" in the American Standard Version, and "HaShem" in the Artscroll Tanach (Orthodox Jewish). Rather than directly translating it, the JPS Tanakh, International Standard Version, Darby Translation, God's Word Translation, Holman Christian Standard Bible, and The Message render the term as "Hallelujah", with the spelling "Halleluyah" appearing in the Complete Jewish Bible. The Greek-influenced form "Alleluia" appears in Wycliffe's Bible, the Knox Version and the New Jerusalem Bible.

In the great song of praise to God for his triumph over the Whore of Babylon in chapter 19 of the New Testament book of Revelation, the Greek word ἀλληλούϊα (allēluia), a transliteration of the same Hebrew word, appears four times, as an expression of praise rather than an exhortation to praise. In English translations this is mostly rendered as "Hallelujah", but as "Alleluia" in several translations, while a few have "Praise the Lord", "Praise God", "Praise our God", or "Thanks to our God".

The linguist Ghil'ad Zuckermann argues that the word Hallelujah is usually not replaced by a praise God! translation due to the belief in iconicity: the perception that there is something intrinsic about the relationship between the sound of the word and its meaning.

In the Bible

הַלְלוּיָהּ is found in 24 verses in the Book of Psalms, but twice in Psalm 150:6. It starts and concludes a number of Psalms.

, the great song of praise to God for his triumph over the Whore of Babylon. It is this usage that Charles Jennens extracted for the Hallelujah Chorus in Handel's Messiah. This transliteration is the basis of the alternative Latin transliteration "Alleluia" that is also used by Christians.

Usage by Jews 
The word "hallelujah" is sung as part of the Hallel Psalms (interspersed between Psalms 113–150).  In Tractate Shabbat of the Talmud, Rabbi Yose is quoted as saying that the Pesukei dezimra Psalms should be recited daily.  Psalms 145–150, also known as the Hallel of pesukei dezimra, are included to fulfill this requirement in the liturgy for the traditional Jewish Shacharit (morning) service.  In addition, on the three Pilgrimage Festivals, the new moon and Hanukkah, Psalms 113-118 are recited.  The latter psalms are known simply as Hallel with no additional qualification.

, ending with Halleluja, is the third and final biblical quotation in the Kedushah.  This expanded version of the third blessing in the Amidah is said during the Shacharit and Mincha (morning and afternoon) services when there is a minyan present.

Usage by Christians 

For most Christians, "Hallelujah" is considered a joyful word of praise to God, rather than an injunction to praise him. The word "Alleluia", a Latin derivative of the Hebrew phrase "Hallelujah" has been used in the same manner, though in Christian liturgy, the "Alleluia" specifically refers to a traditional chant, combining the word with verses from the Psalms or other scripture. In the Latin liturgical rites of the Catholic Church, and in many older Protestant denominations, such as the Lutheran Churches, the Alleluia, along with the Gloria in excelsis Deo, is not spoken or sung in liturgy during the season of Lent, instead being replaced by a Lenten acclamation, while in Eastern Churches, Alleluia is chanted throughout Lent at the beginning of the Matins service, replacing the Theos Kyrios, which is considered more joyful. At the Easter service and throughout the Pentecostarion, Christos anesti is used in the place where Hallelujah is chanted in the western rite expressing happiness.

In day-to-day situations, the expressions of "Hallelujah" and "Praise the Lord" are used by Christians as spontaneous expressions of joy, thanksgiving and praise towards God. In contemporary worship services across denominational lines, the use of these jubilatory phrases require no specific prompting or call or direction from those leading times of praise and singing. In Methodist worship, "Hallelujah!" is a frequently used ejaculatory prayer.

In popular culture 
In modern English, "Hallelujah" is frequently spoken to express happiness that a thing hoped or waited for has happened. An example is its use in the song "Get Happy".

"Hallelujah" was the winning song of the Eurovision Song Contest 1979, performed in Hebrew by Milk and Honey, including Gali Atari, for Israel.

Leonard Cohen's 1984 song "Hallelujah" was initially rejected by Columbia Records for lacking commercial appeal, was popularized through covers by John Cale (1991) and Jeff Buckley (1994), achieved "modern ubiquity" after its inclusion in the animated movie Shrek (2001), and reached the Billboard charts upon Cohen's death in 2016.

See also 
 Praise the Lord, a greeting phrase used by many Christians 
 Alleluia, the Christian liturgical chant
 Alhamdulillah, similar Arabic phrase used by Muslims and by Arabic-speaking Jews and Christians
 Allahu Akbar, similar Arabic phrase
 Subhan Allah, similar Arabic phrase
 "My Sweet Lord", a 1970 song by George Harrison which includes hallelujah along with Hare Krishna

References

External links 

 

Christian prayer
Hallel
Hebrew words and phrases in the Hebrew Bible
Hebrew words and phrases in Jewish prayers and blessings
New Testament Hebrew words and phrases
Psalms
English words